The slender treeshrew (Tupaia gracilis) is a treeshrew species within the Tupaiidae. It is native to Borneo and inhabits foremost lowland old forest.

References

Treeshrews
Mammals of Brunei
Mammals of Indonesia
Mammals of Malaysia
Mammals of Borneo
Mammals described in 1893
Taxa named by Oldfield Thomas
Taxonomy articles created by Polbot